United Nations Security Council Resolution 1736, adopted unanimously on December 22, 2006, after recalling all previous resolutions concerning the situation in the Democratic Republic of the Congo, in Burundi and in the Great Lakes region of Africa, the Council increased the military strength of the United Nations Mission in the Democratic Republic of Congo (MONUC) from January 1, 2007 to February 15, 2007.

Resolution

Observations
The Council again praised the people of the Democratic Republic of the Congo for their commitment towards the democratic process. It noted that 50 military observers temporarily re-deployed from the United Nations Operation in Burundi (ONUB) in accordance with resolutions 1669 (2006) and 1692 (2006) had successfully completed their mission and would be repatriated by December 31, 2006.

As with previous resolutions, Resolution 1736 condemned hostilities in the east of the country carried out by militias and foreign armed groups and further criticised violations of international humanitarian law and human rights, particularly those carried out by the militias, foreign armed groups and elements of the armed forces. In this regard, Council members called on those responsible to be brought to justice.

The Council was aware that the mandates of ONUB and MONUC would end on December 31, 2006 and February 15, 2007 respectively, and anticipated a review of MONUC by the Secretary-General.

Acts
Using Chapter VII powers, the Security Council authorised a temporary increase of 916 military personnel in MONUC from January 1, 2007 to February 15, 2007.  At the same time, the temporary deployment of one infantry battalion and a military hospital from ONUB was also extended. It reaffirmed its intention to review the issue pending a report from the Secretary-General.

See also
 Kivu conflict
 Ituri conflict
 List of United Nations Security Council Resolutions 1701 to 1800 (2006–2008)
 Second Congo War

References

External links
 
Text of the Resolution at undocs.org

 1736
2006 in the Democratic Republic of the Congo
 1736
 1736
December 2006 events